Jacob Heinrich Elbfas (c.1600–1664) was a Baltic German portrait painter.

Elbfas was born in Livonia and educated in Strasbourg, in a tradition dating back to Renaissance portraits.  He established himself in Sweden from 1622 and from 1628 in Stockholm where he became a guild master. During the period 1634 to 1640 he worked as a court painter for Queen Maria Eleonora. He was frequently employed by the Swedish nobility. His influence on Swedish art was considerable until a new generation of artists were invited by Queen Christina during the 1640s.  He died in Stockholm.

See also
History of Sweden

References

17th-century Swedish painters
Swedish male painters
1600s births
1664 deaths
Year of birth uncertain
Baltic-German people
People from Livonia